Brazil competed at the 2020 Summer Paralympics in Tokyo, Japan from 24 August to 5 September 2021.

Medalists

| width="75%" align="left" valign="top" |

| width="25%" align="left" valign="top" |

Medals by sport

Medals by date

Medals by gender

Competitors

Archery

Brazil collected one quota place at the 2019 Para Archery World Championships held in Den Bosch, Netherlands. In March 2021, Brazil gained four more quotas at the Americas Continental Qualification Tournament, held in Monterrey, Mexico.

Men

|-
|align=left|Hélcio Perilo
|align=left|Men's individual W1
|622
|10
|
| W 132–129
| L 129–140
|colspan=3|did not advance
|-
|align=left|Andrey de Castro
|align=left|Men's individual compound
|669
|29
|  L 135–142
|colspan=5|did not advance
|-
|align=left|Heriberto Rocca
|align=left|Men's individual recurve
|581
|27
| L 4–6
|colspan=5|did not advance
|}

Women

|-
|align=left|Rejane Silva
|align=left|Women's individual W1
|525
|11
|
|L 107–115
|colspan=4|did not advance
|-
|align=left|Jane Karla Gogel
|align=left|Women's individual compound
|688
|4
| colspan=2 
| L 140–146
|colspan=4|did not advance
|-
|align=left|Fabíola Dergovics
|align=left|Women's individual recurve
|572
|11
|W 6–4
|W 7–1
|L 1–7 
|colspan=3|did not advance
|}

Mixed team

|-
|align=left|Hélcio PeriloRejane Silva
|align=left|Mixed team W1
|1147
|7
|colspan=2 
|  L 126–131
|colspan=3|did not advance
|-
|align=left|Andrey de CastroJane Karla Gogel
|align=left|Team compound open
|1357
|9
| 
|  L 142–145
|colspan=4|did not advance
|-
|align=left|Heriberto RocaFabíola Dergovics
|align=left|Mixed team recurve
|1153
|11
|
|  L 1–5
|colspan=4|did not advance
|}

Athletics

Lucas Prado, Fábio Bordignon, Petrúcio Ferreira dos Santos, Yohansson Nascimento, Mateus Evangelista, Marivana Oliveira and Izabela Campos are among the athletes to represent Brazil at the 2020 Summer Paralympics.

Men's track

Men's field

Women's track

Women's field

Badminton

Boccia 

Individual

Pairs and teams

Cycling 

Brazil competed in cycling at the 2020 Summer Paralympics.

Road

Track

Equestrian 

Individual

Football 5-a-side

Brazil have qualified after defeating Argentina in the final of the 2018 IBSA World Blind Football Championship.

Group stage

Semi-finals

Gold medal match

Goalball

Brazil have qualified one male and one female teams to the Paralympics after being in the top three in the 2018 IBSA World Goalball Championships in Malmö, Sweden.

Men 

Group Stage

Quarter-finals

Semi-finals

Gold medal match

Women 

Group stage

Quarterfinal

Semifinal

Bronze medal match

Judo

Men

Women

Paracanoeing  

Qualification Legend: FA = Qualify to medal final; SF = Qualify to semifinal

Paratriathlon

Powerlifting

Rowing

Brazil qualified four boats for all rowing classes into the Paralympic regatta. Two crews (men's single and mixed double sculls) qualified after successfully entering the top seven for men's single sculls and top eight for mixed double sculls at the 2019 World Rowing Championships in Ottensheim, Austria. Meanwhile, two more crews, qualified after women's single sculls win the 2021 Final Paralympic Qualification Regatta, in Gavirate, Italy, and mixed coxed four after winning the silver medal.

Qualification Legend: FA=Final A (medal); FB=Final B (non-medal); R=Repechage

Shooting

Brazil entered one athletes into the Paralympic competition. Alexandre Galgani successfully break the Paralympic qualification at the 2019 WSPS World Cup which was held in Al Ain, United Arab Emirates.

Swimming 

36 Brazilian swimmers will compete in swimming at the 2020 Summer Paralympics
Men

Women

Mixed

Table tennis

Brazil entered ten athletes into the table tennis competition at the games. Eight qualified from 2019 Parapan American Games which was held in Lima, Peru and two others via World Ranking allocation.

Men

Women

Taekwondo

Brazil qualified three athletes to compete at the Paralympics competition. Two of them confirmed to compete at the games by winning the gold medal at the 2021 Americas Qualification Tournament in San Jose, Costa Rica, while the other athlete qualified by placing second at the world ranking.

Volleyball

The women's sitting volleyball team qualified for the 2020 Summer Paralympics after being finalist at the 2019 Parapan American Games, since the United States were already qualified after being World Champions.

Summary

Men's tournament 

Group play

Semifinal

Bronze medal match

Women's tournament 

Group play

Semifinal

Bronze medal match

Wheelchair fencing

Source:

Men

Women

Wheelchair tennis

Brazil qualified seven players entries for wheelchair tennis. Five of them qualified by the world rankings, while the other qualified by received the bipartite commission invitation allocation quotas.

See also
Brazil at the Paralympics
Brazil at the 2020 Summer Olympics

References

Nations at the 2020 Summer Paralympics
2021 in Brazilian sport
2020